Yitzchak Abadi (born March 12, 1933) is an Orthodox Jewish Rabbi and Posek and a prominent leader of Orthodox Judaism in the United States and around the world.

Early life
Yitzchak Abadi was born in Venezuela. He moved with his parents to Tiberias, Mandatory Palestine at age 2. As a child Abadi attended school in Haifa. His studies began in the Yishuv Hachdash in Tel Aviv, Israel and continued in Yeshivat Chevron in Jerusalem. At 19 years old, he was sent by the Chazon Ish to study in Montreux, Switzerland. A year later the Chazon Ish sent Abadi to study in Lakewood, New Jersey, under the famed Rabbi Aharon Kotler.

Influence
Rabbi Abadi is a posek, and his students are rabbis across the globe. After Rav Kotler's death, Rabbi Abadi emerged as one of the leading poskim for the Lakewood community. Rabbi Abadi branched out on his own in 1980, opening a premiere halacha Kollel in Lakewood. In 1993, Rabbi Abadi transferred his Kollel to Har Nof, Jerusalem, where it continued to produce scholars trained to decide halachic questions touching on every aspect of Jewish law. Rabbi Abadi moved back to Lakewood in 2009.

Notable decisions
Owing to his prominence as a posek, Rabbi Abadi is asked the most difficult questions, in which he issued a number of innovative and controversial decisions. For instance, his ruling that permits writing a sefer torah through a silk screen process, and a more recent ruling that wigs made with Indian hair may be used. Rav Abadi also composed a short version of Birkat Hamazon based on the Rambam and other Rishonim, if it is difficult for one to say the full version that is customary, one may say this version, even initially as a first choice.

Works
Ohr Yitzchak Vol 1 

Ohr Yitzchak Vol 2 

Booklet on Niddah Laws 

Birkat Hamazon Hakatzar (based on the views of the Rambam and the other Rishonim)

References

External links
 oheltorah.com A kashrut and halachah website by Rabbi Abadi's sons, including a Q&A forum answered "according to the opinions of their father, Rabbi Yitzchak Abadi."

1933 births
Living people
People from Lakewood Township, New Jersey
American Haredi rabbis
Venezuelan emigrants to Mandatory Palestine
Israeli expatriates in Switzerland
Israeli emigrants to the United States
21st-century American Jews